Evangeline is the third album by Gary Lucas, released in 1996 through Zensor.

Track listing

Personnel 
André Grossmann – photography
Rick Hendrick – photography
Robert Jacobson – recording
Tim Kalliches – recording
Gary Lucas – acoustic guitar, production, recording
James McLean – recording
Fred Reid – recording
Joe Saba – recording
Stewart Winter – recording

References

External links 
 

 

1996 albums
Gary Lucas albums